Monroe County Courthouse may refer to:

 Old Monroe County Courthouse, Monroeville, Alabama
 Monroe County Courthouse (Arkansas)
 Monroe County Courthouse (Georgia)
 Monroe County Courthouse (Iowa)
 Monroe County Courthouse (Indiana)
 Monroe County Courthouse (Ohio)
 Monroe County Courthouse (Pennsylvania)
 Monroe County Courthouse (Tennessee)
 Monroe County Courthouse (Wisconsin)

See also
Monroe County (disambiguation)